Jefferson County is a county on the northern border of the U.S. state of New York. As of the 2020 census, the population was 116,721. Its county seat is Watertown. The county is named after Thomas Jefferson, third President of the United States of America. It is adjacent to Lake Ontario, southeast from the Canada–US border of Ontario.

Jefferson County comprises the Watertown-Fort Drum, NY Metropolitan Statistical Area. In 2014, it elected Colleen M. O'Neill as the first woman county sheriff in the state. She had served with the New York State Police for 32 years. The popularity of the area as a summer tourist destination results in a dramatic increase of population during that season.

The United States Army's 10th Mountain Division is based at Fort Drum. The base had a total population of nearly 13,000 according to the 2010 census.

History
When counties were established in the Province of New York in 1683, the present Jefferson County was part of Albany County. This was an enormous county, including the northern part of New York State as well as all of the present State of Vermont and, in theory, extending westward to the Pacific Ocean. This county was reduced in size on July 3, 1766, by the creation of Cumberland County, and further on March 16, 1770, by the creation of Gloucester County, both containing territory now in Vermont.

On March 12, 1772, what was left of Albany County was split into three parts, one remaining under the name Albany County. One of the other pieces, Tryon County, contained the western portion (and thus, since no western boundary was specified, theoretically still extended west to the Pacific). The area then designated as Tryon County now includes 37 counties of New York State. The county was named for William Tryon, colonial governor of New York.

In the years subsequent to 1776, most of the Loyalists in Tryon County fled to Canada. In 1784, following the peace treaty that ended the American Revolutionary War, the name of Tryon County was changed to Montgomery County to honor the general, Richard Montgomery, who had captured several places in Canada and died attempting to capture the city of Quebec, replacing the name of the hated British governor.

In 1789, the size of Montgomery County was reduced by the creation of Ontario County from Montgomery. The area split off from Montgomery County was much larger than the present county, as it was later divided to form the present Allegany, Cattaraugus, Chautauqua, Erie, Genesee, Livingston, Monroe, Niagara, Orleans, Steuben, Wyoming, Yates, and parts of Schuyler and Wayne counties.

Jefferson County is part of Macomb's Purchase of 1791.

In 1791, Herkimer County was one of three counties split off from Montgomery (the other two being Otsego, and Tioga County). This was much larger than the present county, however, and was reduced by a number of subsequent splits. The first one of these, in 1794, produced Onondaga County. This county was larger than the current Onondaga County, including the present Cayuga and Cortland Counties, and part of Oswego County.

Oneida County (as well as a part of Chenango County), was split off from Herkimer County in 1798.

Jefferson County was split off from Oneida County in 1805. In 1817, Carleton Island, captured from the British in the War of 1812, was annexed to the county. During the late eighteenth and nineteenth centuries, the county was largely developed for agriculture.

By the early 20th centuries, Watertown was a city with the highest per capita number of millionaires in the United States. Local industrialists had made early fortunes from industries driven by water power. Mills were established along the falls of the Black River from the first half of the nineteenth century.

In 2019, Jefferson County and much of the rest of the North Country was identified as one of the most politically tolerant communities in America, according to an analysis by PredictWise.

Geography
It is the fourth-largest county in New York by area.

Jefferson County is in New York State's northern lobe, adjacent to the area where the Saint Lawrence River exits Lake Ontario. It is northeast of Syracuse, and northwest of Utica. The county is at the international border with Canada.

The Black River, which empties into Lake Ontario, is an important waterway in the county. Part of the Tug Hill Plateau is in the southern part of the county. The county contains part of the Thousand Islands in the St. Lawrence River, including such large islands as Carleton Island, Grindstone Island, and Wellesley Island.

Adjacent counties
 St. Lawrence County – northeast
 Lewis County – southeast
 Oswego County – southwest
 Leeds and Grenville United Counties, Ontario – north
 Frontenac County, Ontario – northwest

Major highways

  Interstate 81
  Interstate 781
  U.S. Route 11
  New York State Route 3
  New York State Route 3A
  New York State Route 12
  New York State Route 12E
  New York State Route 12F
  New York State Route 26
  New York State Route 37
  New York State Route 180

Demographics

2020 Census

2000 census
As of the census of 2000, there were 111,738 people, 40,068 households, and 28,127 families residing in the county. The county's racial makeup was 88.71% White, 5.83% Black or African American, 0.53% Native American, 0.92% Asian, 0.14% Pacific Islander, 2.05% from other races, and 1.82% from two or more races. 4.19% of the population were Hispanic or Latino of any race. 93.2% spoke English and 3.5% Spanish as their first language.

21.9% were of English, 14.1% Irish, 12.8% German, 8.5% French and 8.5% Italian ancestry according to the 2010 American Community Survey.

There were 40,068 households, of which 37.20% had children under the age of 18 living with them, 55.60% were married couples living together, 10.40% had a female householder with no husband present, and 29.80% were non-families. 24.40% of all households were made up of individuals, and 10.10% had someone living alone who was 65 years of age or older. The average household size was 2.58 and the average family size was 3.07.

26.50% of the county's population was under age 18, 11.80% was from age 18 to 24, 31.30% was from age 25 to 44, 19.10% was from age 45 to 64, and 11.30% were age 65 or older. The median age was 32 years. For every 100 females there were 107.30 males. For every 100 females age 18 and over, there were 108.50 males.

The county's median household income was $34,006, and the median family income was $39,296. Males had a median income of $28,727 versus $21,787 for females. The county's per capita income was $16,202. About 10.00% of families and 13.30% of the population were below the poverty line, including 16.80% of those under age 18 and 9.20% of those age 65 or over.

Education
Jefferson Community College in Watertown provides higher education within the county.

Communities

Larger Settlements

† - County Seat

†† - Former Village

Towns

 Adams
 Alexandria
 Antwerp
 Brownville
 Cape Vincent
 Champion
 Clayton
 Ellisburg
 Henderson
 Hounsfield
 Le Ray
 Lorraine
 Lyme
 Orleans
 Pamelia
 Philadelphia
 Rodman
 Rutland
 Theresa
 Watertown
 Wilna
 Worth

Hamlet

 Sanfords Four Corners

Government
Legislative authority is vested in the county Board of Legislators, which consists of 15 members each elected from single member districts for two-year terms. As of 2018, there are 14 Republicans and 1 Democrat.

|}

Law enforcement
 the sheriff is Colleen M. O'Neill. O'Neill is the first female sheriff elected in the state, and was first elected in 2014.

In 2012, the Sheriff's Office was the subject of three unrelated sexual harassment lawsuits by a female deputy and two other women.

Sites of interest

 Antique Boat Museum
 Boldt Castle
 Burnham Point State Park
 Canoe-Picnic Point State Park
 Cape Vincent
 Carleton Island
 Cedar Point State Park
 Clayton
 Dewolf Point State Park
 Duffy Fairgrounds
 Fairview Manor
 Fort Drum
 Grass Point State Park
 Grenadier Island
 Grindstone Island Upper Schoolhouse
 National Register of Historic Places listings in Jefferson County, New York
 Orleans
 Paddock Arcade
 Paddock Mansion
 Public Square Historic District
 Roswell P. Flower Memorial Library
 Sackets Harbor
 Sackets Harbor Battlefield State Historic Site
 Thousand Islands
 Thousand Islands National Park
 Tibbetts Point Lighthouse
 Union Hotel (Sackets Harbor, New York)
 Watertown
 Wellesley Island State Park

See also

 List of counties in New York

References

Further reading

External links

  Jefferson County webpage
 
  Guide to historical information
  Summary history of Jefferson County, NY and its towns
  Jefferson County NY Wiki

 
New York (state) counties
1805 establishments in New York (state)
Populated places established in 1805
Thousand Islands